Antonio Siyaka (born 27 January 1996) is a Belarusian footballer playing currently for Veles-2020 Vitebsk.

References

External links
 
 
 Profile at Pressball.by

1996 births
Living people
People from Mogilev
Sportspeople from Mogilev Region
Belarusian footballers
Association football midfielders
Belarus youth international footballers
FC Dnepr Mogilev players
FC Granit Mikashevichi players
FC Molodechno players
FC Gorki players
FC Orsha players